Petter Skarheim (born 12 June 1962) is a Norwegian civil servant. He is Secretary General of the Ministry of Education and Research.

In 2004 he was appointed director of the newly established Norwegian Directorate for Education and Training. He had been a deputy under-secretary of State in the Ministry of Education and Research from 1998 to 2004.

References

1962 births
Living people
Directors of government agencies of Norway
Norwegian civil servants